Chehel Ghani (also Romanized as Chehel Ghānī and Chehel Qānī) is a village in Kuh Hamayi Rural District, Rud Ab District, Sabzevar County, Razavi Khorasan Province, Iran. At the 2006 census, its population was 92, in 24 families.

References 

Populated places in Sabzevar County